Volok may refer to:

Volok (unit), a unit of land measurement
Volok Reform, land reform in the 16th-century Grand Duchy of Lithuania

People with the surname
Bill Volok (1910–1991), American football player
Ilia Volok (born 1965), Russian actor

See also
Voloka (disambiguation)
Volokh